is a village located in Maniwa District, Okayama Prefecture, Japan. , the village had an estimated population of 847 in 378 households and a population density of 13 persons per km2. It is a member of The Most Beautiful Villages in Japan Association.

Geography
Shinjō is located in the north central part of Okayama Prefecture, separated from Tottori Prefecture to the north by the Chugoku Mountains. Mountains and forests occupy most of the village area].

Neighboring  municipalities 
Okayama Prefecture
Niimi
Maniwa
Tottori Prefecture
Hino
Kōfu

Climate
Shinjō has a Humid subtropical climate (Köppen Cfa) characterized by warm summers and cold winters with heavy snowfall.  The average annual temperature in Shinjō is 11.4 °C. The average annual rainfall is 1883 mm with September as the wettest month. The temperatures are highest on average in January, at around 23.3 °C, and lowest in January, at around -0.5 °C.

Demography
Per Japanese census data, the population of Shinjō has been as follows. The population has been steadily declining since the 1950s

History 
Shinjō is part of ancient Mimasaka Province. After the Meiji restoration, the area was organized  into Shinjō village with the creation of the modern municipalities system on June 1,1889.

Government
Shinjō has a mayor-council form of government with a directly elected mayor and a unicameral village council eight members. Shinjō, collectively with the city of Maniwa, contributes one member to the Okayama Prefectural Assembly. In terms of national politics, the village is part of the Okayama 3rd district of the lower house of the Diet of Japan.

Economy
The main economic activity in the area is forestry and agriculture. Shinjō grows a variety of rice called hime no mochi. This rice is used to make the mochi rice cakes for which this town is also known.  The hime no mochi factory is a major employer in Shinjō.

Education
Shinjō has one public elementary school and one public junior high school operated by the village government. The village does not have a high school.

Transportation

Railway 
The village does not have any passenger railway service. The nearest train station is Neu Station on then JR West Hakubi Line in Hino, Tottori or Chūgoku-Katsuyama Station on the Kishin Line in Maniwa, Okayama.

Highways

Local attractions
This village is known for the cherry trees along its main street, which is called . These trees were planted to celebrate the Japanese victory over Russia in the Russo-Japanese War in 1905. There are many old buildings along Victory Cherry Blossom Street. Many of these buildings used to be in that were built to accommodate the sankin kōtai mandatory processions of daimyō from their domains to the capital and back.

References

External links

Shinjō official website 

Villages in Okayama Prefecture